The deputy premiers of Quebec (French: Vice-premier ministres du Québec (masculine) or Vice-première ministres du Québec (feminine)), is the deputy head of government in Quebec.

There was no deputy premier until July 1960.

In the 1960s, the post was sometimes referred to as the vice president of the Executive Council.

The post has been temporarily vacant twice: after the death of Premier Daniel Johnson, Sr. when the incumbent deputy premier, Jean-Jacques Bertrand, became premier; and after the death of Deputy Premier Pierre Laporte. Besides Bertrand, two other deputy premiers, Bernard Landry and Pauline Marois, later became premier, though both did so some years after their tenure as deputy premier had ended.

List
{| class="wikitable"
|-
! !! Name !! District  (Region) !! Took office !! Left office !! Party 

|Georges-Émile LapalmeMontréal-Outremont(Montreal West)19601964Liberal

|Paul Gérin-LajoieVaudreuil-Soulanges(Montérégie)19641966Liberal

|Jean-Jacques BertrandMissisquoi(Eastern Townships)19661968Union Nationale

|nonen.a.26 September196811 December1968Union Nationale

|Jean-Guy CardinalBagot(Montérégie)19681970Union Nationale

|Pierre LaporteChambly(Montérégie)197017 October 1970Liberal

|nonen.a.17 October19701972Liberal

|Gérard D. LevesqueBonaventure(Gaspésie—Îles-de-la-Madeleine)19721976Liberal

|Jacques-Yvan MorinSauvé(Montreal East)19761984Parti Québécois

|Camille LaurinBourget(Montreal East)19841984<td> [[Parti Québécois]]
{{Canadian party colour|QC|PQ|row}}
|[[Marc-André Bédard (politician)|Marc-André Bédard]]<td>[[Chicoutimi]]<br>([[Saguenay–Lac-Saint-Jean]])<td>1984<td>1985<td> [[Parti Québécois]]
{{Canadian party colour|QC|Liberal|row}}
|[[Lise Bacon]] <td>[[Chomedey, Quebec|Chomedey]]<br>([[Laval, Quebec|Laval]])<td>1985<td>1994<td> [[Parti libéral du Québec|Liberal]]
{{Canadian party colour|QC|Liberal|row}}
|[[Monique Gagnon-Tremblay]]<td>[[Saint-François (electoral district)|Saint-François]]<br>([[Estrie|Eastern Townships]])<td>1994<td>1994<td> [[Parti libéral du Québec|Liberal]]
{{Canadian party colour|QC|PQ|row}}
|[[Bernard Landry]]<td>[[Verchères]]<br>([[Montérégie]])<td>1994<td>2001<td>[[Parti Québécois]]
{{Canadian party colour|QC|PQ|row}}
|[[Pauline Marois]]<td>[[Taillon]]<br>([[Montérégie]])<td>2001<td>2003<td> [[Parti Québécois]]
{{Canadian party colour|QC|Liberal|row}}
|[[Monique Gagnon-Tremblay]]<td>[[Saint-François (electoral district)|Saint-François]]<br>([[Estrie|Eastern Townships]])<td>2003<td>2005<td> [[Parti libéral du Québec|Liberal]]
{{Canadian party colour|QC|Liberal|row}}
|[[Jacques Dupuis (politician)|Jacques Dupuis]]<td>[[Saint-Laurent (borough)|Saint-Laurent]]<br>([[Montreal West]])<td>2005<td>2007<td>[[Parti libéral du Québec|Liberal]]
{{Canadian party colour|QC|Liberal|row}}
|[[Nathalie Normandeau]]<td>[[Bonaventure]]<br>([[Gaspésie—Îles-de-la-Madeleine]])<td>2007<td>2011<td>[[Parti libéral du Québec|Liberal]]
{{Canadian party colour|QC|Liberal|row}}
|[[Line Beauchamp]]<td>[[Bourassa-Sauvé]]<br>([[Montreal North]])<td>2011<td>2012<td>[[Quebec Liberal Party|Liberal]]
{{Canadian party colour|QC|Liberal|row}}
|[[Michelle Courchesne]]<td>[[Fabre (electoral district)|Fabre]]<br>([[Laval, Quebec|Laval]])<td>2012<td>2012<td>[[Quebec Liberal Party|Liberal]]
{{Canadian party colour|QC|PQ|row}}
|[[François Gendron]]<td>[[Abitibi-Ouest (provincial electoral district)|Abitibi-Ouest]]<br>([[Abitibi-Témiscamingue]])<td>2012<td>2014<td> [[Parti Québécois]]
{{Canadian party colour|QC|Liberal|row}}
|[[Lise Thériault]]<td>[[Anjou (electoral district)|Anjou–Louis-Riel]]<br>([[Montreal]])<td>23 April 2014<td>11 October 2017<td>[[Quebec Liberal Party|Liberal]]
{{Canadian party colour|QC|Liberal|row}}
|[[Dominique Anglade]]<td>[[Saint-Henri–Sainte-Anne]]<br>([[Montreal]])<td>11 October 2017<td>18 October 2018<td>[[Quebec Liberal Party|Liberal]]
{{Canadian party colour|QC|CAQ|row}}
|[[Geneviève Guilbault]]<td>[[Louis-Hébert (provincial electoral district)|Louis-Hébert]]<br>([[Capitale-Nationale]])<td>18 October 2018<td>''present''<td>[[Coalition Avenir Québec]]
|}

Footnotes
<references/>

See also
 [[List of Quebec general elections]]
 [[Timeline of Quebec history]]
 [[National Assembly of Quebec]]
 [[List of premiers of Quebec]]
 [[List of leaders of the Official Opposition (Quebec)]]
 [[List of third party leaders (Quebec)]]
 [[History of Quebec]]

For more lists of this type, see [[Lists of office-holders]].

External links
 [http://www.assnat.qc.ca/fr/patrimoine/viceprescons_exec.html Les vice-premiers ministres et vice-présidents du Conseil exécutif depuis 1961] {{in lang|fr}}

{{Politics of Quebec}}
{{Canada topic|Deputy premier of}}

[[Category:Deputy premiers of Quebec| ]]
[[Category:Lists of political office-holders in Quebec|Deputy Premiers]]